Alan Davidson (14 July 1897 – 1 August 1962) was an Australian cricketer. He played four first-class cricket matches for Victoria between 1927 and 1931.

See also
 List of Victoria first-class cricketers

References

External links
 

1897 births
1962 deaths
Australian cricketers
Victoria cricketers
Cricketers from Melbourne